Parapheromia is a genus of moths in the family Geometridae.

Species
Parapheromia cassinoi
Parapheromia falsata
Parapheromia configurata
Parapheromia lichenaria
Parapheromia ficta

References

Geometridae